Stonewall Jackson High School was the name of several schools in the United States:

Stonewall Jackson High School (Kanawha County, West Virginia), closed in 1989, now West Side Middle School since 2020.
 Unity Reed High School in Bull Run, Virginia was called Stonewall Jackson High School until 2020. 
Mountain View High School (Shenandoah County, Virginia) was called Stonewall Jackson High School until 2020.

See also
 Stonewall Jackson School (disambiguation)